Amber Marshall may refer to:

Amber Marshall (actress) (born 1988), Canadian actress, singer, and equestrian
Amber Marshall (soccer), American soccer player
Amber Marshall (tennis) (born 2001), Australian tennis player